Ntuthuko MacBeth-Mao Sibaya (born 25 November 1977), known as MacBeth Sibaya, is a South African professional football coach and a former player who played as a defensive midfielder. He coaches at the KZN Academy.

Club career
Sibaya was born in Durban, KwaZulu-Natal. He previously played for III. Kerületi TUE in Hungary as well as Jomo Cosmos in South Africa,  Rosenborg BK in Norway and FC Rubin Kazan in Russia.

International career
Sibaya is a regular for the South Africa national football team, having amassed a total of 52 caps. He was part of the final squads at the 2002 and 2010 World Cups.

Coaching career
After retiring, Sibaya started working as an analyst at SuperSport United. In August 2015, Sibaya was appointed manager of SuperSport United's reserve team. He later resigned to concentrate on his coaching badges.

In February 2021, Sibaya was appointed U19 manager at the KwaZulu-Natal Football Academy.

Honors
Rubin Kazan
 Russian Premier League; 2008, 2009
 Russian Super Cup; 2010
 CIS Cup; 2010
 La Manga Cup; 2005, 2006

References

External links
 
 Nils Arne Eggen om MacBeth Sibaya
 RBK Profile 
 
 BBC 2002 World Cup profile

1977 births
Living people
Sportspeople from Durban
South African soccer players
Association football midfielders
South Africa international soccer players
South African expatriate soccer players
Expatriate footballers in Hungary
III. Kerületi TUE footballers
South African expatriate sportspeople in Hungary
Jomo Cosmos F.C. players
Expatriate footballers in Norway
Eliteserien players
Rosenborg BK players
South African expatriate sportspeople in Norway
Expatriate footballers in Russia
Russian Premier League players
FC Rubin Kazan players
Moroka Swallows F.C. players
South African expatriate sportspeople in Russia
2002 African Cup of Nations players
2004 African Cup of Nations players
2002 FIFA World Cup players
2009 FIFA Confederations Cup players
2010 FIFA World Cup players